Michel Sersen (born December 28, 1985) is a Slovak professional ice hockey defenceman who currently plays HC Slovan Bratislava of the Slovak Extraliga. Sersen was drafted by the Pittsburgh Penguins 130th overall in the 5th round of the 2004 NHL Entry Draft.

Playing career
Sersen began his professional career with Bratislava at age 17 in 2002. During the 2002–03 season he had five goals and four assists in 33 games with the junior team before being promoted to the top-level Extraliga team. At the end of the season he entered the Quebec Major Junior Hockey League Import Draft and was selected first overall by the Rimouski Océanic, where he was teammates with the Sidney Crosby, the Penguins' first selection in 2005. In his first season, he scored 25 points in 45 games and 6 points in 9 playoff games. He played the 2005–06 season for the Quebec Remparts, scoring 79 points in 63 games, and 21 points in 23 playoff games. That season he was on the Memorial Cup All-Star team, second-team QMJHL for the regular season and the 2005–06 QMJHL Plus-Minus champion.

After failing to earn a spot on the Wilkes-Barre/Scranton Penguins roster in 2006, Sersen returned to Slovakia to again play for Bratislava. Pittsburgh traded the rights to Sersen to the Tampa Bay Lightning in October 2008.

Career statistics

Regular season and playoffs

International

Awards and honors

References

External links

1985 births
Living people
HC Sparta Praha players
Avtomobilist Yekaterinburg players
HC '05 Banská Bystrica players
HC Lev Praha players
HC Slovan Bratislava players
People from Gelnica
Sportspeople from the Košice Region
Pittsburgh Penguins draft picks
Rimouski Océanic players
Quebec Remparts players
Slovak expatriate ice hockey players in Russia
Slovak ice hockey defencemen
Slovak expatriate ice hockey players in Canada
Slovak expatriate ice hockey players in the Czech Republic